A contingencies fund or contingency fund is a fund for emergencies or unexpected outflows, mainly economic crises.

European Union 
The European Union created a vast contingency fund in 2010 to counteract the Great Recession.

India
The Constitution of India authorized the parliament to establish a contingency fund of India. The Contingency Fund of India is established under Article 267(1) of the Indian Constitution. It is in the nature of an imprest (money maintained for a specific purpose). Accordingly, Parliament enacted the contingency fund of India Act 1950. The fund is held by the Finance Secretary (Department of Economic Affairs) on behalf of the President of India and it can be operated by executive action.
The Contingency Fund of India exists for disasters and related unforeseen expenditures. In 2005, it was raised from Rs. 50 crore to Rs 500 crore. In 2021, it was proposed to raise the fund to Rs 30,000 crore. Approval of the Parliament of India for such expenditure and for withdrawal of an equivalent amount from the Consolidated Fund is subsequently obtained to ensure that the corpus of the Contingency Fund remains intact. 
Similarly, Contingency Fund of each State Government is established under Article 267(2) of the Constitution – this is in the nature of an imprest placed at the disposal of the Governor to enable him/her to make advances to meet urgent unforeseen expenditure, pending authorization by the State Legislature. Approval of the Legislature for such expenditure and for withdrawal of an equivalent amount from the Consolidated Fund is subsequently obtained, whereupon the advances from the Contingency Fund are recouped to the Fund. The corpus varies across states and the quantum is decided by the State legislatures.

Spain 
In Spain, the contingency fund is used in economic crisis for public work and similar stimulus activities. There is social security contingencies fund called reserve fund, to pay pensions.

United Kingdom 
In the early part of the nineteenth century, the Civil Contingencies Fund was created in the United Kingdom. It is held by the Treasury, and its use is regulated by the Miscellaneous Financial Provisions Act 1946. It may be used for urgent expenditure in anticipation that the money will be approved by Parliament, or for small payments that were not included in the year's budget estimates.

The Contingencies Fund Act 1974 sets the size of the fund as two percent of the amount of the government budget in the preceding year. This was temporarily amended by the Contingencies Fund Act 2020 and later the Contingencies Fund Act 2021 in light of the COVID-19 pandemic.

When Parliament votes to approve the urgent expenditure, the money are repaid into the Contingencies Fund. As Parliament is effectively forced to approve actions ex post facto (after they have happened), the Treasury's use of the fund is scrutinised in detail by the Public Accounts Committee.

See also 

 American Recovery and Reinvestment Act of 2009
 Keynes
 Rainy day fund
 Social security

Notes

References 
  

Economic crises
Public finance